The following is a list of academic buildings within the Pennsylvania State University system.

University Park

Note that a number of older buildings are included in the Farmers' High School Historic District added to the National Register of Historic Places in 1981.

Ag Hill area
The Ag Hill Complex was added to the National Register of Historic Places in 1979.
Agricultural Engineering Building
Agricultural Sciences and Industries Building
Berkey Creamery
Business Building
Food Science Building
Forest Resources Building
Headhouse Buildings I-III
Henning Building
Lewis Katz Building
McCoy Natatorium
Tyson Building

Allen Road area
Arts Building
CEDAR Building
Chambers Building
Ford Building
Moore Building
Music Building I
Music Building II
Rackley Building

College of Science area

Althouse Laboratory
Boucke Building
Buckhout Laboratory
Chemical & Biomedical Engineering Building (CBEB)
Chemistry Building
Davey Laboratory
Frear North Building
Frear South Building
Life Sciences Building
Mueller Laboratory
Osmond Laboratory
Ritenour Building
Thomas Building
Wartik Laboratory
Whitmore Laboratory

EMS & Engineering East area
Deike Building
Electrical Engineering East Building
Electrical Engineering West Building
Engineering Units A-C
Hammond Building (Penn State)|Hammond Building
Hosler Building
Reber Building
Sackett Building
Steidle Building
Willard Building

EMS & Engineering West area

Applied Research Laboratory
Applied Sciences Building
Earth-Engineering Sciences Building
Hallowell Building
Leonhard Building
Information Sciences and Technology Building
Research West Building
Walker Building

Hastings Road area
Academic Activities Building
Forest Resources Laboratory
Pegula Ice Arena
Materials Research Laboratory
Research East Building

HUB-Robeson Center area
Grange Building
Health and Human Development East Building
Henderson Building
Henderson South Building
McAllister Building
White Building
Biobehavioral Health Building

Innovation Park area
Innovation Park
Lubert Building

Intramural Building area
Intramural Building
Shields Building
Wagner Building

Nittany Lion Inn area
Biomechanics Laboratory
Carpenter Building
Keller Building
Kern Building
Mateer Building

Palmer Museum of Art area
Armsby Building
Arts Cottage
Borland Building
Ferguson Building
Forum Building
Patterson Building
Pavilion Theatre
Stuckeman Family Building
Visual Arts Building
Weaver Building

Pattee Library area
Burrowes Building
Carnegie Building
Chandlee Laboratory
Old Botany Building
Oswald Tower
Pond Laboratory
Sparks Building

Rec Hall area
Noll Laboratory
Rec Hall

Commonwealth campuses

This portion of the list excludes those buildings in which an insignificant number of courses are held or those buildings that have an obvious use other than that of academics (e.g., libraries, administration buildings, and student centers).

Abington
Sutherland Hall
Lares Building
Rydal Building
Conference Center
Spring House
Woodland Building
Athletic Building 
Cloverly Building

Altoona
Cypress Building
Force Advanced Technology Center
Hawthorn Building
Holtzinger Engineering Building
Science Building
Smith Building

Beaver
General Classroom Building
Laboratory Classroom Building
Michael Baker Jr. Building

Berks
Franco Building
Luerssen Building
Perkins Student Center
Gaige Technology and Business Innovation Building
Beaver Community Center
Boscov-Lakin Information Commons

Brandywine

Main Building
Tomezsko Building
Vairo Library
Commons Building
Orchard Hall

DuBois
DEF Technology Center
Multipurpose Building
Smeal Building
Swift Building

Erie
Kochel Center
Nick Building
Otto Behrend Science Building
Jack Burke Research & Economic Development Center

Fayette
Biomedical Building
Eberly Building
Engineering Building
Williams Building

Greater Allegheny
Crawford Building
Frable Building
Main Building
Ostermayer Laboratory

Great Valley
 Main building
 The Conference Center at Penn State Great Valley (formerly known as the Safeguard Scientifics Building prior to 2010)

Harrisburg
Olmsted Building
Science and Technology Building
Library 
Student Enrichment Center
Educational Activities Building
Capital Union Building
Swatara Building
Engineering Technology Laboratory

Hazleton
Butler Learning Center
Graham Academic Building
Kostos Building
Memorial Building
Physical Education Building

Lehigh Valley
Academic Building
Corporate Learning Center
Modular Building

Mont Alto
General Studies Building
Science & Technology Center

New Kensington
Activities Building
Blissell Center
Conference Center
Engineering Building
Science and Technology Building
Science Building

Schuylkill
Classroom Building
Multipurpose Building

Shenango

Forker Laboratory
Lecture Hall
Physical Therapy Building
Science Building
Sharon Hall

Wilkes-Barre
Athletics & Recreation Building
Nesbitt Academic Commons
Science Building
Technology Center

Worthington Scranton
Dawson Building
Gallagher Conference Center
Student Learning Center
Business Building

York
Grumbacher IST Center
Main Classroom Building
Pullo Performing Arts Center

References

External links 
 Campus Maps 
 Abington College Campus Maps 

Pennsylvania State University campus